Old Swan is an eastern neighbourhood of Liverpool, Merseyside, England, bordered by Knotty Ash, Stoneycroft, Broadgreen, Fairfield and Wavertree. At the 2011 Census, the population was 16,461.

Description
Old Swan is centred on the road junction between Prescot Road, running east to west, Derby Lane (from the north) St Oswald Street (from the south) and Broadgreen Road (from the south-east). It is named after a public house called the Three Swans, which served the pack-horse route along Prescot Lane (now Prescot Road) in the 18th century. The name was derived from the coat of arms of local landowners, the Walton family.
The inn stood at the corner of Prescot Lane and Pettycoat Lane (now Broadgreen Road). The junction later acquired two more pubs, the Swan Vaults (now called the Old Swan) and the Cygnet (now closed), while the original pub was replaced by another, the Red House (now closed); this has become a branch of Costa Coffee.

Geography
The A57 road passes through Kensington and Fairfield before running through Old Swan and then through Knotty Ash, towards Prescot and on to St Helens.

Housing in the district is mostly in densely packed terraced houses, though there are exceptions. Doric Park is tucked away behind rows of terraced houses. Liverpool Shopping Park runs parallel to Old Swan. The retail park is currently being improved and phase 2 opened in Autumn 2020.

Health
There are numerous primary care services located within Old Swan, including a NHS walk-in health centre, along with an urgent care unit, a GP practice on Derby Lane, and several pharmacies and opticians. 

There are also several dentists practices within the ward.

Old Swan also has an emergency ambulance station which is located on St. Oswalds Street.

Government
Old Swan's representation on Liverpool City Council is largely through the Old Swan ward, though parts also lie in Tuebrook and Stoneycroft ward.
The elected councillors for Old Swan ward are Councillor William Shortall (Labour Party), Councillor Joanne Calvert (Independent) and Councillor Rona Heron (Liverpool Community Independents).

Old Swan is represented by Paula Barker MP (Labour Party) and is in the parliamentary constituency of Liverpool Wavertree; prior to the constituency's re-creation the area was part of Liverpool Broadgreen.

Council Services

Old Swan library is managed by Liverpool City Council. The was built with Victorian black and white features, originally opening in 1913 as a reading room, and has its own garden, the entrance to which is on the A57.

Economy

Old Swan has a varied collection of clothes and food shops situated along Prescot Road serving local residents. In addition, the area is also served by a large Tesco supermarket and an Aldi facing it across St. Oswald Street. Further down Prescot Road, away from the city centre, is a Sainsbury's supermarket in neighbouring Knotty Ash ward. During 2011, Asda took over the Netto premises, and it is now an Asda supermarket. In July 2015, work began refurbishing the Red House pub and a Costa Coffee store was opened later the same month.

Transport
Fairly regular bus routes 7, 8, 9 and 10/10A/10B connect Old Swan to Liverpool City Centre and in the opposite direction to Huyton, Prescot, St Helens and Warrington. Old Swan has other bus links - routes 60, 61, 62, 68/68A, 81/81A and 102, which do not serve Liverpool City Centre but provide important links to other areas of Liverpool including Aigburth, Anfield, Bootle, Childwall, Clubmoor, Croxteth, Fazakerley, Hunt's Cross, Mossley Hill, Norris Green, Orrell Park, Speke, Toxteth, Tuebrook, Walton, Wavertree, West Derby, Woolton and Liverpool John Lennon Airport.

There is a bus depot in Old Swan on Green Lane. It is owned by Arriva North West.

The M62 motorway starts at the end of Broadgreen Road out of the city, and is the east gateway into the city via Edge Lane Drive.

The nearest railway stations to Old Swan are Broad Green railway station and Wavertree Technology Park railway station. Both are operated by Northern and served by local stopping trains to and from Liverpool Lime Street.
The Merseytram System (Line 2) was due to run through Old Swan but this has now been cancelled after funding from the British Government was denied. 

The Old Swan Tramway was one of the first street tramways in Britain, opening in 1861.

Education
There are six schools in Old Swan, including Broadgreen Primary School, St Anne's Stanley C of E Primary, St Oswald's Catholic Primary, Corinthian Avenue Primary, St Cuthbert Catholic Primary and Dixons Broadgreen Academy, a secondary school with an adjoining sixth form. There are also three nurseries in the area.

Places of worship
The Parish Church is St Anne's on Prescot Road. In September 2022, Lady Dodd endowed stained glass windows at St Anne's Church, in memory of her late husband, Sir Ken Dodd.

Notable residents
Former Manchester United manager Ron Atkinson was born in Old Swan.
Judith Berry (nee. Hawkins), mother of Academy Award-winning American actress Halle Berry, was born in Old Swan.
Alan Caldwell, known as Rory Storm, rock 'n' roll singer of the late 1950s and early 1960s. He was born in Old Swan in 1939,  was a member of Old Swan Boys' Club (1956–57) and attended St Margaret's Anfield School.
Dennis Evans, former captain of Arsenal F.C., was born in Old Swan.
Tommy Scott, lead singer with 1990s band Space lived in Old Swan at the height of their fame.
Jazz Saxophonist Ken Stubbs, leader of First House, was born in Old Swan.

References

External links

 Old Swan History
 Liverpool City Council, Ward Profile: Old Swan
 Liverpool Street Gallery - Liverpool 13
 Old Swan and surrounding area - History - Pics

Areas of Liverpool